Dmytro Volodymyrovych Svyatash (born 15 June 1971) is a Ukrainian activist and politician, member of Party of Regions. From May 2002 to July 2019, he served as a member of the Verkhovna Rada. Due to criminal proceedings in 2019 fled to Russia. During Russo-Ukrainian War he is considering by Russian political circles as a potential "Gauleiter" of Slobozhanshchyna.

Life 
Svyatash was born in Kharkiv in 1971 in a family of doctor Vladimir Nikolaevich Svyatash. His family lives in Kharkiv from the postwar years. In 1988, Dmitriy graduated the high school № 1 named after Lenin. In 1994, he graduated the Kharkiv Medical Institute, specializing in pediatrics. In 2001, he completed his studies as a lawyer at the National Yaroslav Mudry Law Academy. A year earlier, Svyatash graduated economic at the Institute for Advanced Studies and Retraining heavy machinery. Then in 2007, he graduated the Kharkiv Regional Institute on Public Administration degree.

Political career 
In the 2002 Ukrainian parliamentary election, gaining 24% of the votes, Svyatash was elected as a deputy of Ukraine from 171 majority district (Moskovskyi District of Kharkiv). He became a member of the Committee on Finance and Banking. 
In the 2004 Ukrainian presidential election, he was a trustee of presidential candidate Viktor Yanukovych. In 2005 Svyatash became a member of the Party of Regions.
In 2006, he became Vice-Chairman of the Committee on Finance and Banking.
After the 2007 parliamentary elections in the ranks of Party of Regions, he becomes the head of the subcommittee on taxation of non-market financial institutions and entities of the stock market of the Committee on Taxation and Customs Policy.

On February 18, 2014, Svyatash was under suspicion of wanting to leave the country, when protesters of the Euromaidan movement refused him entry to his house, and brought him to nearby Bertuk. (https://www.youtube.com/watch?v=1YtelP6DPBE)

In the 2014 Ukrainian parliamentary election, Svyatash was re-elected into the Ukrainian parliament as a non-partisan after winning a majority district 171 seat in Kharkiv with 34.01% of the votes.

In the 2019 Ukrainian parliamentary election Svyatash lost re-election as an Opposition Platform — For Life candidate in his Kharkiv single-seat constituency 170. He gained second place with 29.77% of the vote, finishing second after winner Andriy Odarchenko (with 44.41% of the votes).

References

 сайт ВРУ
 Довідник «Хто є хто в Україні»

1971 births
Living people
Politicians from Kharkiv
Yaroslav Mudryi National Law University alumni
Party of Regions politicians
Fourth convocation members of the Verkhovna Rada
Fifth convocation members of the Verkhovna Rada
Sixth convocation members of the Verkhovna Rada
Seventh convocation members of the Verkhovna Rada
Eighth convocation members of the Verkhovna Rada
Recipients of the Honorary Diploma of the Cabinet of Ministers of Ukraine